Mokulēia is a North Shore community and census-designated place (CDP) in the Waialua District on the island of Oahu, City & County of Honolulu, Hawaii, United States. Mokulēia means "isle [of] abundance" in Hawaiian. As of the 2020 census, the CDP had a population of 1,816. Features of interest here include Mokulēia Beach, Mokulēia Polo Field, and Dillingham Airfield, west of the town.

At the western end of Farrington Highway, approximately  beyond Dillingham Airfield entrance, begins the track (trail) to Kaena Point, the westernmost tip of Oahu.

The U.S. postal code for Mokulēia is 96791.

Geography 

Demographics 

At the 2000 census, there were 1,839 people, 709 households, and 384 families residing in Mokulēia. The racial makeup of the CDP was 57.21% White, 1.47% Black or African American, 0.27% Native American, 11.36% Asian, 5.60% Pacific Islander, 0.60% from other races, and 23.49% from two or more races. 7.29% of the population were Hispanic or Latino of any race.

Of the 709 households 25.7% had children under the age of 18 living with them, 37.8% were married couples living together, 11.4% had a female householder with no husband present, and 45.7% were non-families. 31.3% of households were one person and 2.5% were one person aged 65 or older. The average household size was 2.38 and the average family size was 3.04.

The age distribution was 21.5% under the age of 18, 16.1% from 18 to 24, 36.1% from 25 to 44, 20.3% from 45 to 64, and 6.0% 65 or older. The median age was 30. For every 100 females there were 134.0 males. For every 100 females age 18 and over, there were 139.7 males.

The median household income was $50,100 and the median family income was $57,917. Males had a median income of $36,458 versus $27,317 for females. The per capita income was $24,643. 10.7% of the population and 10.5% of families were below the poverty line. Of the total population, 15.1% of those under 18 and 7.8% of those 65 and older were living below the poverty line.

References

Census-designated places in Honolulu County, Hawaii
Populated places on Oahu
Populated coastal places in Hawaii